The Fea's muntjac or Tenasserim muntjac (Muntiacus feae) is a rare species of muntjac native to southern Myanmar and Thailand. It is a similar size to the common muntjac (adult weight is 18 – 21 kg (40 - 46 lb)).
It is diurnal and solitary, inhabiting upland evergreen, mixed or shrub forest (at an altitude of 2500 m (8200')) with a diet of grasses, low-growing leaves, and tender shoots.
The young are usually born in dense vegetation, remaining hidden until able to travel with the mother.

It is named after zoologist Leonardo Fea. Its other name comes from the Tenasserim Hills, between Burma and Thailand.

References

External links

 Animal Info - Fea's Muntjac

Fea's muntjac
Mammals of Southeast Asia
Mammals of Myanmar
Mammals of Thailand
Fea's muntjac
Fea's muntjac